Waste comes in many different forms and may be categorized in a variety of ways. The types listed here are not necessarily exclusive and there may be considerable overlap so that one waste entity may fall into one to many types.

 Agricultural waste
 Animal by-products
 Biodegradable waste
 Biomedical waste
 Bulky waste
 Business waste
 Chemical waste
 Clinical waste
 Coffee wastewater
 Commercial waste
 Composite waste
 Construction and demolition waste (C&D waste)
 Controlled waste
 Demolition waste
 Dog waste
 Domestic waste
 Electronic waste (e-waste)
 Food waste
 Green waste
 Grey water
 Hazardous waste
 Household waste
 Household hazardous waste
 Human waste
 Sewage sludge
 Industrial waste
 Slag
 Fly ash
 Sludge
 Inert waste
 Inorganic waste
 Kitchen waste
 Litter
 Marine debris
 Medical waste
 Metabolic waste
 Mineral waste
 Mixed waste
 Municipal solid waste
 Nuclear waste (see Radioactive waste)

 Organic waste
 Packaging waste
 Post-consumer waste
 Radioactive waste
 Low level waste
 High level waste
 Mixed waste (radioactive/hazardous)
 Spent nuclear fuel
 Recyclable waste
 Residual waste
 Retail hazardous waste
 Sewage 
 Sharps waste
 Ship disposal
 Slaughterhouse waste
 Special waste (see Hazardous waste)

See also

 List of waste management companies
 List of waste management topics
 List of solid waste treatment technologies
 List of Superfund sites in the United States
 List of topics dealing with environmental issues
 Pollution
 Waste management

was